Xu Hong Bai is a Paralympian athlete from China competing mainly in category F35/36 shot put and discus events.

Xu competed in the 2004 Summer Paralympics in Athens where she won a silver in the F35/36/38 discus as well as competing in the F35/36 shot put.

References

Paralympic athletes of China
Athletes (track and field) at the 2004 Summer Paralympics
Paralympic silver medalists for China
Living people
Chinese female discus throwers
Chinese female shot putters
Medalists at the 2004 Summer Paralympics
Year of birth missing (living people)
Paralympic medalists in athletics (track and field)
21st-century Chinese women